Gomis (spelling variant: Gomiz) is a Catalan surname, equivalent to Gomes in Portuguese, and Gómez in Spanish. It is also a Senegalese and Bissau Guinean surname, borrowed from Portuguese, sharing the same spelling.

Gomis may refer to:
Adelaida Ferré Gomis (1881-1955), Catalan lace-maker
Alfred Gomis, Senegalese–Italian footballer
Anna Gomis, French wrestler
Bafétimbi Gomis, French footballer of Senegalese descent
Bedsenté Gomis, semi-professional French footballer
Émilie Gomis, French female basketball player
José Melchor Gomis (1794-1836), Spanish composer
Joseph Gomis, French basketball player
Kafétien Gomis, French long jumper
Marcel Gomis, Senegalese footballer
Morgaro Gomis, Senegalese footballer
Oswald Gomis, 10th Archbishop of Colombo
Rémi Gomis, French-born Senegalese footballer
Roger Gomis, Senegalese footballer
Víctor Gomis, a Spanish football player currently playing for CD Castellón

See also
Gomes, equivalent Portuguese surname
Gómez, equivalent Spanish surname
Gomiz

Catalan-language surnames